This is a list of defunct airlines of Spain.

See also
 List of airlines of Spain

References

External links 

 Defunct Airlines Europe

Airlines, defunct
Spain
Airlines, defunct